Emerald Hill is a north-western suburb of Harare, Zimbabwe. The suburb was named so because of either (i) the colour of the hill due to the large number of trees or (ii) an Irish connection: many of the roads in the suburb have Irish names.

On the hill in the centre of the suburb are located a school for the deaf and a children's home. Emerald Hill is also home to St. John's High School and Gateway High School (Zimbabwe), two of the city's best high schools.

History
Originally part of Avondale Farm, which was peri-urban to the early City of Harare, Emerald Hill was incorporated into the city in 1934. The northwest corner of Emerald Hill, known as "New Emerald Hill" was originally under the Marlborough Town Management Board and incorporated into the City of Harare in 1971, but only built up in late 1990s.

Features
Emerald Hill is thought to have been named so either due to its verdant hill due to the large number of trees or its many  Irish connections – many of the roads in the suburb have Irish origins, such as Dublin, Belfast, Wicklow and Cork. The area is also notable for its Catholic institutions such as St. John's High School and the Dominican Convent.

While the area was home to an Irish Catholic community they have largely been assimilated into the larger white Zimbabwean community or have joined the ranks of the Zimbabwean diaspora abroad. Like parts of the North West, Emerald Hill is relatively well off, leafy and quiet but have become slightly rough around the edges since the mid-2000s. The country's economic crisis in that decade led to thousands of local university-educated residents and professionals emigrating to the United Kingdom, Canada and Australia, thus the area lacks much of the wealth and vibrancy it had in the nineties and early 2000s.

Points of interest
Notable institutions in Emerald Hill include;

 St. John's High School
 Gateway High School
 Emerald Hill Orphanage and School
 Emerald Hill School For The Deaf
 Ethiopian Airlines Corporate Office
 Old Mutual
 Prices Avenue Golf Range
 The Southern African Power Pool (SAPP)

References

Suburbs of Harare